Jeremy Mark Pocklington CB (born 13 October 1973) is a British civil servant who has served as Permanent Secretary of the Department for Energy Security and Net Zero since February 2023. He served as Permanent Secretary of the Department for Levelling Up, Housing and Communities (DLUHC) from March 2020 (when it was the Ministry of Housing, Communities and Local Government (MHCLG)) to February 2023. He was formerly Director General for Housing and Planning at the MHCLG, having served in that role from August 2018 until his appointment as Permanent Secretary at the MHCLG.

Early life and education 
Pocklington was born on 13 October 1973 to David Pocklington and Valerie Pocklington. He was educated at Manchester Grammar School. He later studied at Exeter College in the University of Oxford, graduating with a Bachelor of Arts in Modern History in 1995. He later went on to graduate with a Master of Philosophy in Economics and Social History with distinction in 1997 from the same college.

Career 
Pocklington began his civil service career in 1997 when he joined HM Treasury, where over a number of years he was responsible for financial regulation, tax policy and fiscal policy, and, at one point, worked as an assistant private secretary to two Chief Secretaries to the Treasury. He was head of property tax from 2004 until 2006, when he became deputy director responsible for corporate finance and public-private partnerships, a position he remained in until 2009. In 2009 Pocklington joined the Cabinet Office as the Director of the National Economic Council secretariat. In 2010 he became director of the Economic and Domestic Affairs Secretariat.

In 2012, Pocklington was appointed as the director of the Enterprise and Growth Unit at HM Treasury, responsible for policy on growth, business, infrastructure and advising on public spending for a number of government departments. In 2015, Pocklington was appointed as Director General of the Markets and Infrastructure Group at the Department for Energy and Climate Change before being appointed as Director General for Energy and Security at the Department for Business, Energy and Industrial Strategy.

In 2018, Pocklington became Director General for Housing and Planning at the MHCLG. 

Pocklington was appointed Companion of the Order of the Bath (CB) in the 2020 New Year Honours for public service.

On 30 March 2020, the then Cabinet Secretary, Sir Mark Sedwill, with the approval of the prime minister, approved the appointment of Pocklington as the new Permanent Secretary to the Ministry of Housing, Communities and Local Government following a brief period as acting Permanent Secretary following the resignation of Dame Melanie Dawes. When the Ministry for Housing, Communities and Local Government became the Department for Levelling Up, Housing and Communities in 2021, Pocklington became Permanent Secretary to the new department.

In February 2023, he became Permanent Secretary of the Department for Energy Security and Net Zero.

Personal life 
Pocklington married Katy Jane Wigley in 2005. He lists his recreations as hillwalking.

Notes

References 

1973 births
Living people
English civil servants
Companions of the Order of the Bath
Alumni of Exeter College, Oxford